The West Central Community School District  is a rural public school district headquartered in Maynard, Iowa.

The district is located completely within Fayette County, and serves Maynard, Randalia, Westgate, and the surrounding rural areas.

The mascot is the Blue Devils, and the colors are blue and white.

Schools
The district operates two schools in a single facility in Maynard:
 West Central PK-8 School
 West Central Charter High School

West Central High School

Athletics
The Blue Devils compete in the Upper Iowa Conference in the following sports:

Cross Country
Volleyball
Football
1997 Class A State Champions
The Blue Devils notably held the defending state champions, Don Bosco, to only 16 points in 2018
Basketball
 Girls 2-time State Champions (1956, 1958) 
 On November 26 of 2019, The Colossal Bowl was held as a charity food drive event, in which Team Chaos faced off against Team Sharing Is Caring in a 3 on 3 game of high stakes basketball. The latter team reigned victorious.
Wrestling (with Oelwein)
Bowling (with Oelwein)
Track and Field 
Golf 
Soccer
Baseball 
Softball
 1958 State Champions

See also
List of school districts in Iowa
List of high schools in Iowa

References

External links
 West Central Community School District

School districts in Iowa
Education in Fayette County, Iowa